Anja Huber (born 20 May 1983 in Berchtesgaden) is a German skeleton racer who has competed since 2003. She earned two gold medals at the 2008 FIBT World Championships in Altenberg, Germany, winning them in women's skeleton and the mixed bobsleigh-skeleton team event.

Huber finished eighth in the women's skeleton event at the 2006 Winter Olympics in Turin and earned a bronze medal at the 2010 Winter Olympics in Vancouver.

Huber won the women's overall Skeleton World Cup in 2010–11 season.

References

 2006 women's skeleton results

External links

 
 
 
 
 

1983 births
Living people
People from Berchtesgaden
Sportspeople from Upper Bavaria
German female skeleton racers
Skeleton racers at the 2006 Winter Olympics
Skeleton racers at the 2010 Winter Olympics
Skeleton racers at the 2014 Winter Olympics
Olympic skeleton racers of Germany
Olympic bronze medalists for Germany
Olympic medalists in skeleton
Medalists at the 2010 Winter Olympics
20th-century German women
21st-century German women